The 1913 Indiana Hoosiers football team was an American football team that represented Indiana University Bloomington during the 1913 college football season. In their ninth season under head coach James M. Sheldon, the Hoosiers compiled a 3–4 record, finished in eighth place in the Western Conference, and were outscored by their opponents by a combined total of 162 to 90.

Schedule

References

Indiana
Indiana Hoosiers football seasons
Indiana Hoosiers football